Otto GmbH & Co KG (doing business as Otto Group, stylized as otto group, formerly Otto Versand) is a German mail order company and one of the world's biggest e-commerce companies. Based in Hamburg, it operates in more than twenty countries. Otto is primarily a retail e-commerce company, and as a shareholder, it also operates in e-commerce services. The Otto group has expanded into real estate and financial services.

In France, Otto claims to be the leading e-commerce business through 3 Suisses. In June 2013, Otto executed a full takeover to become its only shareholder.

History 
The family of executive board chairman Michael Otto owns the majority of the company. The company is based in Hamburg, Germany. It was founded by Werner Otto in 1949. The first catalogue was hand produced offering twenty eight styles of shoes.

During the 1950s, the product range business volume expanded. Otto introduced telephone orders in 1963, and launched an online shopping website in 1995.

Michael Otto was the former owner of Spiegel, Inc., (the parent company of Eddie Bauer and the former owners of the catalogue Spiegel). It filed for bankruptcy on 17 March 2003.

On 25 May 2005, Spiegel, Inc., emerged from bankruptcy renamed Eddie Bauer Holdings, and was primarily owned by Commerzbank.

Subsidiaries 
Individual companies of the Otto Group:
About You
Alba Moda
Baumarkt Direct
Baur
bonprix
Venus Fashion
Crate & Barrel 
EOS
Frankonia
Freemans Grattan Holdings
Freemans
Grattan
Look Again
Gifts365.co.uk
Clearance365.co.uk
Witt international UK
Swimwear365.co.uk
Curvissa
bonprix UK
Kaleidoscope/ Acquisition DiLusso.it
Oli
Hanseatic Bank (25%)
Hanseatic Versicherungsdienst
Hansecontrol
Hansecontrol-Cert (49%)
Heine
Hermes Europe
Hermes Parcel Services in Germany, Italy, Austria and Russia
 Hermes UK, rebranded as Evri (25%)
Bombay Company
Küche&Co
Lascana
Limango
Manufactum
Mirapodo
MyToys.de (74.8%)
Yomonda
OFT
OTTO
OTTO Doosan Mail Order
OTTO Group Russia
OTTO Japan
Eddie Bauer Japan
OTTO Office (verkauft an Printus im Jahr 2015)
Otto International
Phi-t products & services (50%)
RatePay
Schwab
Shopping24
Smatch.com
3 Suisses International Group 
Cofidis (49%)
Venca
Witt Weiden
Witt-Group
Witt International UK 
Fegro/Selgros

References

External links 

 
Suisses International Group

Companies based in Hamburg
Retail companies established in 1949
Mail-order retailers
German brands
Online retailers of Germany
Otto family
German companies established in 1949